Feel the Need is the second solo album by the American musician James "J.T." Taylor, released in 1991. The album includes hits "Long Hot Summer Night" and "Heart to Heart" (duet with Stephanie Mills).

Critical reception

The Orlando Sentinel wrote that Taylor "has the savvy to incorporate today's high-tech gadgetry into his soulful sound without letting it dominate him."

Track listing

References

External links
 Feel The Need at Discogs
 Official Website

James "J.T." Taylor albums
1991 albums
MCA Records albums